Filatov is a rural locality (a khutor) in Sizovskoye Rural Settlement, Chernyshkovsky District, Volgograd Oblast, Russia. The population was 174 as of 2010. There are 6 streets.

Geography 
Filatov is located on the right bank of the Tsimla River, 30 km south of Chernyshkovsky (the district's administrative centre) by road. Basakin is the nearest rural locality.

References 

Rural localities in Chernyshkovsky District